The 1935 Cork Intermediate Hurling Championship was the 26th staging of the Cork Intermediate Hurling Championship since its establishment by the Cork County Board in 1909.

Ballincollig won the championship following a 4-02 to 3-02 defeat of St. Columb's in the final. This was their fourth championship title in the grade and their second title in succession.

Results

Final

References

Cork Intermediate Hurling Championship
Cork Intermediate Hurling Championship